Dr. Seshadri Ramanujan Chari is an Indian politician, journalist, author and strategic and foreign policy analyst. Chari is a swayamsevak of the Rashtriya Swayamsevak Sangh (RSS). Chari currently serves on the National Executive Committee of the Bharatiya Janata Party (BJP) and formerly served as head of the Foreign Affairs Cell at BJP headquarters. Seshadri Chari has also been a consultant on governance with the United Nations Development Program (UNDP), posted at Juba, South Sudan.

Early life and education
Born in Matunga, Mumbai (then Bombay) on April 2, 1953 to father Ramanujan Chari and mother Kalyani, Tamil Brahmins from Tanjavur, Seshadri Chari is one of five children. While his father worked for Sri Ram Mills and Hindustan Polymers, he was also active in the local Congress Party, it was his mother who had great influence on his growing years. A young Seshadri started going to RSS Shakha at an early age of four but became active only in his teens. As a Mukhya-Shikshak of a RSS Shakha largely attended by daily wage earners from Kerala, he was also active in the labour union led by CPM leader Ahilya Rangnekar. This association brought him close to Mr. Rangnekar and comrade B. T. Ranadive with whom he would engage in political and ideological discussions. One of his uncles S. T. Chary, who was a close associate of V.K Krishna Menon and an admirer of Pt. Jawaharlal Nehru, fine tuned his journalistic aspirations.

A debater and student activist at Chinai College of Commerce and Economics, Mumbai University, Chari became be part of the RSS sponsored anti-Emergency underground movement Lok Sangharsh Samiti. He offered satyagrah and was imprisoned at Arthur Road Jail.

He earned his B.Com, LLB and MA (History) degrees from the University of Bombay. He was awarded PhD by Manipal Academy of Higher Education (MAHE) for his thesis on "Regional Dynamics of Indo-Pacific Region and Implications of China's Influence in India's Extended Neighbourhood".

Political career
Post Emergency, he became a pracharak, first in Mumbai Mahanagar and then Thane. In 1988, he was transferred to the BJP where he became the general secretary of the BJP Mumbai unit.

Chari rose to prominence as editor of the RSS's weekly journal Organiser.  He wrote extensively during his incumbency from 1992 to 2004.

In 2007, Chari was president of the Party Worker Training Cell of the RSS where he was considered a moderate.

Seshadri Chari is currently engaged as Director (International Affairs), Institute for National Security Studies (INSS), Director, Forum for Strategic & Security Studies (FSSS), Secretary-General, Forum for Integrated National Security (FINS), Non-officio member, Research and Information Systems for developing countries, and is also the Director of Chronicle Society of India for Education & Academic Research (CSIEAR), a high –profile NGO actively engaged in promoting educational activities and conducting significant research in areas like Pluralism and Democracy, Conflict Resolution, Role of religion in fostering communal harmony. He is also the Vice-President for the Society for Consumers' and Investors' Protection.

Bibliography

References

External links
 BJP official website
 

Living people
1953 births
Bharatiya Janata Party politicians from Maharashtra
People from Mumbai
Rashtriya Swayamsevak Sangh pracharaks